A statue of Martha Hughes Cannon by Laura Lee Stay Bradshaw is installed outside the Utah State Capitol in Salt Lake City, in the U.S. state of Utah.

References

External links
 

Monuments and memorials in Utah
Outdoor sculptures in Salt Lake City
Sculptures of women in Utah
Statues in Utah
Utah State Capitol